Sophie Cruz (born 17 December 2010) is an American activist. Her parents are undocumented immigrants from the state of Oaxaca, Mexico; Cruz's activism is geared toward ensuring the continuance of the DAPA (Deferred Action for Parents of Americans) program, which would allow her parents to remain in the United States legally.

Background

In 2015, when Sophie Cruz was five years old, Pope Francis visited Washington out for undocumented immigrants. That day, she wore a shirt printed with the words "Papa Rescate DAPA," urging the Pope to support the DAPA in D.C.  She was born in the United States, but her parents are undocumented and could face deportation. She hoped to meet the Pope to deliver a note asking him to speak Action for Parents of Americans Act.  When the Pope's car passed by, Sophie ran out into the street to see him but was turned away by security. However, the Pope had seen her run out from the crowd and requested to meet her. He hugged her, and she left her note with his attendants. Pope Francis addressed the issue at a joint meeting of the United States Congress the next day, encouraging greater openness for immigrants and refugees.

Cruz's trip to see the Pope was sponsored by La Hermandad Mexicana Transnacional, a Los Angeles-based immigration advocacy organization. In an interview, Cruz said: "I believe I have the right to live with my parents. I have the right to be happy. My dad works very hard in a factory galvanizing pieces of metal. All immigrants just like my dad feed this country. They deserve to live with dignity. They deserve to live with respect."

Meeting with President Obama

In May 2016, Cruz was invited to visit then President Barack Obama at the White House for a Cinco de Mayo celebration. Because her parents were undocumented, they were not able to enter the White House, and instead, Sophie was accompanied by Alida Garcia from FWD.us and filmmaker Paola Mendoza. Mendoza had previously directed a short video, "Free Like the Birds," starring Sophie and her family that debuted in the Tribeca Film Festival. She appeared in the video "11 Million Stories" in partnership with FWD.us, which discussed the potential implications of national mass-deportation and how children like her, with undocumented parents, faced certain obstacles.

Women's March on Washington

On January 21, 2017, Cruz was a featured                                                                                                                speaker at the Women's March in Washington, D.C., in protest against the inauguration of Donald Trump.

References

External links
 
 "Making a Mural of Hope in San Jose" on the making of Sophie Holding the World Together by El Mac

American child activists
American people of Mexican descent
Living people
2010 births
Activists from California
Immigrant rights activists